Valeriy Ihorovych Boldenkov (born 8 September 1994) is a Moldovan-born Ukrainian footballer who plays as a centre-back for Karpaty Lviv .

Career
Boldenkov is a product of the Moldovan FC Nistru Otaci and BRW-BIK Volodymyr-Volynskyi youth sportive schools. He transferred to the Ukraine in 2007 and was granted Ukrainian citizenship in 2010.

He spent his career in the Ukrainian Premier League Reserves and in July 2014 went to play for FC Dynamo-2 in the Ukrainian First League. Boldenkov made his debut in the Ukrainian First League for the club FC Dynamo-2 Kyiv in a match against FC Desna Chernihiv on 27 September 2014 entraining in the second half.

Note
Valeriy Boldenkov has two profiles at Soccerway. One as a Ukrainian footballer and another as a Moldovan footballer.

References

External links
Profile at Official UAF Site (Ukr)

 (currently deleted)

1994 births
Living people
Ukrainian footballers
FC Dynamo Kyiv players
Association football defenders
Ukrainian First League players
Ukrainian Second League players
FC Dynamo-2 Kyiv players
Ukrainian expatriate footballers
Ukrainian expatriate sportspeople in Moldova
Expatriate footballers in Moldova
FC Volyn Lutsk players
CS Petrocub Hîncești players
FC Pyunik players
FC Karpaty Lviv players
Armenian Premier League players
Expatriate footballers in Armenia
Ukrainian expatriate sportspeople in Armenia
Ukrainian people of Moldovan descent
Ukraine under-21 international footballers